Camp Gen. Rigoberto Atienza or Camp Atienza in Libis, Quezon City was named after the 9th Chief of Staff of the Armed Forces of the Philippines.  Camp Atienza serves as the headquarters of the 51st Engineer Brigade, Philippine Army.

History
Camp Rigoberto Atienza used to be the location of the Marikina Waterworks during the 19th century.  Water from the Marikina River was pumped by the waterworks up the hills of Santolan, and by gravity the waters was brought via aqueduct to the El Deposito or currently the Pinaglabanan Shrine in San Juan City.  During the Philippine Revolution and the Philippine–American War, the Marikina Waterworks was a strategic location which opposing forces tried to take over as this would give them control over the water supply to the 300,000 inhabitants of Manila. One of the famous battles in the vicinity was the Battle of Paye where Gen. Henry Ware Lawton was killed fighting with the forces led by Licerio Gerónimo

Originally known as the "Santolan Barracks", the facility was renamed Camp General Rigoberto J Atienza on 8 October 1979 pursuant to GO Nr 377, GHQ AFP dated 6 June 1979 in honor of the first Engineer Officer to serve as AFP Chief of Staff and has served as a Second Lieutenant at the Old Santolan Barracks in Libis, Quezon City. Co-located with the brigade headquarters in Camp Atienza is the Headquarters and Headquarters Company and the Engineer Maintenance and Support Battalion (Provisional).

During Typhoon Ondoy, September 2009, extreme floods affected part of Camp Atienza due to unrelenting rains and the overflowing of the banks of the Marikina River.  Despite that the camp was bordered by riprap stone against the river, it wasn't able to spare itself the brunt of mother nature.

The damaged facilities are as follows; WAC Quarters, Deputy Commander's Quarters, Office of the Command Communication, Electronics
and Information Office (G6), the Officers’ Club House, and BOQ. The estimated cost of the damaged facilities and equipment was P1. 8M.  The damage came after the new gate of the camp has been inaugurated.

The camp's unit was put into action in the repair and restoration of not only the base's facilities but other affected parts of the Marikina Valley.

Location
Camp Atienza is located on the banks of the Marikina River about a kilometer north of Eastwood City in Libis.

Facilities
100m firing range
Sarge Coffeeshop
Officer's Club
BOQ
WAQ Quarters

See also
 Philippine Army
 Camp Aguinaldo

References

External links 
 51st Engineering Brigade Philippine Army Website

Army installations of the Philippines
Military facilities in Metro Manila
Buildings and structures in Quezon City